Shelly Willingham (born November 27, 1943) is a Democratic member of the North Carolina House of Representatives. He has represented the 23rd district (which includes all of Martin and Edgecombe counties) since 2015. He previously served in the House from 2002 to 2003.

Political career
Willingham was first appointed to the 70th district of the North Carolina House of Representatives in 2002 to succeed Toby Fitch, who stepped down to become a judge. Willingham ran for a full term in the new 24th district (the geographic successor to the 70th district) in 2002, but lost the primary to Jean Farmer-Butterfield who went on to win the general election. Willingham unsuccessfully challenged state senator Clark Jenkins in the 2004, 2006, and 2008 primaries. Willingham then served 2 terms on the Edgecombe County School Board. Willingham returned to the NC House in 2015, after being elected in 2014 to the 23rd district. Since his initial election in 2014, Willingham has been re-elected to the NC House a total of 3 times, most recently in 2020.

Electoral history

2020

2018

2016

2014

2008

2006

2004

2002

Committee assignments

2021-2022 Session
Appropriations 
Appropriations - Transportation
Alcoholic Beverage Control (Vice Chair)
Insurance (Vice Chair)
Election Law and Campaign Finance Reform
Rules, Calendar, and Operations of the House
State Personnel

2019-2020 Session
Appropriations 
Appropriations - Transportation 
Alcoholic Beverage Control 
Insurance 
Election Law and Campaign Finance Reform
Rules, Calendar, and Operations of the House
State and Local Government

2017-2018 Session
Appropriations
Appropriations - Justice and Public Safety
Alcoholic Beverage Control
Elections and Ethics Law
Rules, Calendar, and Operations of the House
State Personnel
Transportation

2015-2016 session
Appropriations
Appropriations - Information Technology
Alcoholic Beverage Control
Elections
Agriculture
Banking
Education - Universities
Judiciary IV

References

External links

|-

Living people
1943 births
People from Rocky Mount, North Carolina
Elizabeth City State University alumni
Democratic Party members of the North Carolina House of Representatives
African-American state legislators in North Carolina
21st-century American politicians
21st-century African-American politicians
20th-century African-American people